Salvia is the largest genus of plants in the family Lamiaceae, with the number of species estimated to range from 700 to nearly 3,000. Members include shrubs, herbaceous perennials, and annuals. There are three main regions of radiation of Salvia: Central and South America and Middle America and Mesoamerica, Latin America and with Africa-Eurasia and North America, (America), with approximately 600 species; North-Northern, Central and West-Western Asia and the Mediterranean with approx. 250 species; Eest-Eastern and South-Southern Asia and Australia and Oceania with approximately 90 species.

The naming of distinct Salvia species has undergone regular revision, with many species being renamed, merged, and reclassified over the years. Salvia officinalis (common sage), for example, has been cultivated for thousands of years, yet has been named and described under six different scientific names since 1940 alone. At one time there were over 2,000 named species and subspecies. The most recent revision was done in 1988 by Gabriel Alziar of the Jardin botanique de la Ville de Nice—it consolidated the number of different species to approximately 700. As new discoveries are made, the taxonomic list of Salvia species will continue to change.

The first significant accounting of the genus was done by George Bentham  in 1832–1836, based on a similarity in staminal morphology between Salvia members. His work, Labiatarum Genera et Species (1836), is still the most comprehensive organization of Salvia. Even though there were only 291 species at that time, he still considered the possibility of forming five or six genera, due to differences between certain groups of Salvia. Bentham eventually organized the genus into four subgenera and twelve sections, based on differences in the corolla, calyx, and stamens. In the last 100 years, that system of organization is generally not endorsed by botanists.

The classification of Salvia has long been based on the genus' unusual pollination and stamen structure, which was presumed to have evolved only once. More recently, a study using DNA sequencing of Salvia species has shown that different versions of this lever mechanism have evolved at least three different times within Salvia. This clearly makes the genus non-monophyletic, which means that members of the genus have evolved from different ancestors, rather than sharing one common ancestor. The DNA analysis has shown that the genus may consist of as many as three different clades, or branches. The study concluded that Salvia is not a natural genus—some of its branches have a closer relationship to other genera in the tribe Mentheae than to other Salvia species.

A

Salvia absconditiflora Greuter & Burdet, 1985.
Salvia acuminata Ruiz & Pav, 1798.
Salvia adenocaulon P.H.Davis
Salvia adenophora Fernald, 1900.
Salvia adenophylla Hedge & Hub.-Mor.
Salvia adiantifolia E.Peter, 1935.
Salvia adoxoides C.Y. Wu, 1977.
Salvia aegyptiaca L., 1753.
Salvia aequidens Botsch.
Salvia aequidistans Fernald, 1900.
Salvia aerea H. Lév.,1913.
Salvia aethiopis L., 1753.
Salvia africana L.
Salvia africana-lutea L.
Salvia alamosana Rose, 1891.
Salvia alariformis L.O. Williams, 1972.
Salvia alata Epling, 1960.
Salvia alatipetiolata Sun, 1960.
Salvia alba J. R. I. Wood
Salvia albicalyx Gonzalez-Galledos, 2013
Salvia albicaulis Benth.
Salvia albiflora M. Martens & Galeotti, 1844.
Salvia albimaculata Hedge & Huber-Morath.
Salvia albocaerulea Linden, 1857.
Salvia alborosea Epling & Játiva, 1966.
Salvia alexeenkoi Pobed.
Salvia algeriensis Desf.
Salvia aliciae E.P.Santos
Salvia altissima Pohl.
Salvia alvajaca Oerst., 1854.
Salvia amethystina Sm., 1790.
Salvia amissa Epling
Salvia amplexicaulis Lam.
Salvia amplicalyx E.Peter
Salvia amplifrons Briq., 1896.
Salvia anastomosans Ramamoorthy, 1984.
Salvia anatolica Hamzaoğlu & A.Duran
Salvia andreji Pobed.
Salvia anguicoma Epling
Salvia angulata Benth., 1835.
Salvia angustiarum Epling
Salvia apiana Jeps., 1908.
Salvia apparicii Brade & Barb.Per.
Salvia appendiculata E. Peter, 1935.
Salvia arabica Al-Musawi & Weinert
Salvia aramiensis Rech.f., 1950.
Salvia arborescens Urb. & Ekman
Salvia arbuscula Fernald, 1910.
Salvia arduinervis Urb. & Ekman, 1926.
Salvia arenaria St.Hilaire.
Salvia areolata Epling, 1944.
Salvia argentea L.
Salvia ariana Hedge
Salvia aridicola Briq.
Salvia aristata Aucher ex Benth., 1848
Salvia arizonica A. Gray
Salvia arthrocoma Fernald, 1907.
Salvia articulata Epling, 1936.
Salvia aspera M. Martens & Galeotti, 1844.
Salvia asperata Falc. ex Benth., 1848
Salvia asperifolia Benth.
Salvia assurgens Kunth, 1818.
Salvia atrocalyx Epling, 1935.
Salvia atrocyanea Epling.
Salvia atropaenulata Epling, 1939.
Salvia atropatana Bge.
Salvia atropurpurea C.Y. Wu, 1977.
Salvia atrorubra C.Y. Wu, 1977.
Salvia aucheri Benth.
Salvia aurita L.
Salvia austriaca Jacq.
Salvia austromelissodora Epling & Játiva, 1966.
Salvia axillaris Moc. & Sessé, 1833.
Salvia axilliflora Epling.
Salvia ayavacensis Kunth, 1818.
Salvia ayayacensis Kunth.
Salvia aytachii Vural & Adigüzel
Salvia azurea Lam., 1805.

B

Salvia bahorucona Urb. & Ekman
Salvia baimaensis S.W.Su & Z.A.Shen
Salvia balansae Noë ex Coss. 
Salvia balaustina Pohl
Salvia baldshuanica Lipsky
Salvia ballotiflora Benth. 
Salvia ballsiana (Rech.f.) Hedge
Salvia bariensis Thulin
Salvia barrelieri Etl. 
Salvia bazmanica Rech.f. & Esfand.	
Salvia beckeri Trautv. 
Salvia benthamiana Gardner ex Fielding
Salvia betulifolia Epling
Salvia bifidocalyx C.Y.Wu & Y.C.Huang
Salvia biserrata M.Martens & Galeotti
Salvia blancoana Webb & Heldr. 
Salvia blepharophylla Brandegee ex Epling
Salvia boegei Ramamoorthy
Salvia bogotensis Benth. 	 		
Salvia booleana B.L.Turner
Salvia borjensis E.P.Santos
Salvia bowleyana Dunn
Salvia brachyantha (Bordz.) Pobed. 
Salvia brachyloba Urb. 
Salvia brachyloma E.Peter
Salvia brachyodon Vandas
Salvia brachyodonta Briq. 
Salvia brachyphylla Urb. 
Salvia bracteata Banks & Sol. 
Salvia brandegeei Munz
Salvia breviconnectivata Y.Z.Sun ex C.Y.Wu
Salvia breviflora Moc. & Sessé ex Benth. 
Salvia brevilabra Franch. 
Salvia brevipes Benth. 
Salvia broussonetii Benth. 
Salvia buchananii Hedge
Salvia bucharica Popov
Salvia buchii Urb. 
Salvia bulleyana Diels
Salvia bullulata Benth.

C

Salvia caaguazuensis Briq.
Salvia cabonii Urb.
Salvia cabulica Benth.
Salvia cacaliifolia Benth.
Salvia cadmica Boiss.
Salvia caespitosa Montbret & Aucher  ex Benth.
Salvia calaminthifolia Vahl
Salvia calcicola Harley
Salvia californica Brandegee
Salvia calolophos Epling
Salvia camarifolia Benth.
Salvia campanulata Wall ex Benth.
Salvia campicola Briq.
Salvia camporum Epling
Salvia campylodonta Botsch.
Salvia canariensis L.
Salvia candelabrum Boiss.
Salvia candicans M.Martens & Galeotti
Salvia candidissima Vahl
Salvia canescens C.A.Mey.
Salvia capillosa Epling
Salvia carbonoi Fern.Alonso
Salvia cardenasii J. R. I. Wood
Salvia cardiophylla Benth.
Salvia carduacea Benth.
Salvia carnea Kunth
Salvia cassia Sam. ex Rech.f.
Salvia castanea Diels
Salvia cataractarum Briq.
Salvia caudata Epling
Salvia cavaleriei H.Lév.
Salvia caymanensis Millsp. & Uline
Salvia cedronella Boiss.
Salvia cedrosensis Greene
Salvia ceratophylla L.
Salvia cerradicola E.P.Santos
Salvia chalarothyrsa Fernald
Salvia chamaedryoides Cav.
Salvia chamelaeagnea Berg.
Salvia chanryoenica Nakai
Salvia chapadensis E.P.Santos & Harley
Salvia chapalensis Briq.
Salvia chiapensis Fernald
Salvia chicamochae J.R.I.Wood & Harley
Salvia chienii E.Peter
Salvia chinensis Benth.
Salvia chionantha Boiss.
Salvia chionopeplica Epling
Salvia chionophylla Fernald
Salvia chloroleuca Rech.f. & Aellen
Salvia chorassanica Bunge
Salvia chrysophylla Stapf
Salvia chudaei Batt. & Trab.
Salvia chunganensis C.Y.Wu & Y.C.Huang
Salvia cilicica Boiss.
Salvia cinica Migo
Salvia cinnabarina M.Martens & Galeotti
Salvia circinnata Cav.
Salvia clarendonensis Britton
Salvia clausa Vell.
Salvia clevelandii (A.Gray) Greene
Salvia clinopodioides Kunth
Salvia coahuilensis Fernald
Salvia coccinea Buc'hoz ex Etl.
Salvia cocuyana Fern.Alonso
Salvia codazziana Fern.Alonso
Salvia coerulea Benth.
Salvia cognata Urb. & Ekman
Salvia colonica Standl. & L.O.Williams ex Klitg.
Salvia columbariae Benth.
Salvia comayaguana Standl.
Salvia compar (Wissjul.) Trautv. ex Sosn.
Salvia compressa Vent.
Salvia compsostachys Epling
Salvia concolor Lamb. ex Benth.
Salvia confertiflora Pohl
Salvia congestiflora Epling
Salvia connivens Epling
Salvia consimilis Epling
Salvia consobrina Epling
Salvia corazonica Gilli
Salvia cordata Benth.
Salvia coriana Quedensley & Véliz
Salvia corrugata Vahl
Salvia costaricensis Oerst.
Salvia costata Epling
Salvia coulteri Fernald
Salvia crinigera Gand.
Salvia crucis Epling
Salvia cruikshanksii Benth.
Salvia cryptoclada Baker
Salvia cryptodonta Fernald
Salvia cuatrecasana Epling
Salvia cubensis Britton & P.Wilson
Salvia curta Epling
Salvia curticalyx Epling
Salvia curtiflora Epling
Salvia curviflora Benth.
Salvia cuspidata Ruiz & Pav.
Salvia cyanantha Epling
Salvia cyanescens Boiss. & Balansa
Salvia cyanicalyx Epling
Salvia cyanocephala Epling
Salvia cyanotropha Epling
Salvia cyclostegia E.Peter
Salvia cylindriflora Epling
Salvia cynica Dunn

D

Salvia dabieshanensis J.Q.He
Salvia darcyi J.Compton
Salvia dasyantha Lem.
Salvia decumbens Alain
Salvia decurrens Epling
Salvia densiflora Benth.
Salvia dentata Aiton
Salvia deserta Schangin
Salvia deserti Decne.
Salvia desoleana Atzei & V.Picci
Salvia diamantina E.P.Santos & Harley
Salvia dichlamys Epling
Salvia dichroantha Stapf
Salvia digitaloides Diels
Salvia discolor Kunth
Salvia disermas L.
Salvia disjuncta Fernald
Salvia divaricata Montbret & Aucher ex Benth.
Salvia divinorum Epling & Játiva
Salvia dolichantha E.Peter
Salvia dolomitica Codd
Salvia dombeyi Epling
Salvia dominica L.
Salvia dorisiana Standl.
Salvia dorrii (Kellogg) Abrams
Salvia drobovii Botsch.
Salvia drusica Mouterde
Salvia drymocharis Epling ex Standl.
Salvia dryophila Epling
Salvia dugesiana Epling
Salvia dumetorum Andrz. ex Besser
Salvia durantiflora Epling
Salvia durifolia Epling
Salvia duripes Epling & Mathias

E

Salvia ecbatanensis Stapf
Salvia ecuadorensis Briq.
Salvia eichleriana Heldr. ex Halácsy
Salvia eigii Zohary
Salvia eizi-matudae Ramamoorthy
Salvia ekimiana F. Celep & DoğanSalvia elegans VahlSalvia elenevskyi Pobed.Salvia emaciata EplingSalvia engelmannii A.GraySalvia eplingiana AlziarSalvia eremophila Boiss.Salvia eremostachya Jeps.Salvia eriocalyx Bertero ex Roem. & Schult.Salvia eriophora Boiss. & KotschySalvia ernesti-vargasii C.NelsonSalvia erythropoda RusbySalvia erythrostephana EplingSalvia erythrostoma EplingSalvia espirito-santensis Brade & Barb.Per.Salvia euphratica Montbret & Aucher ex Benth.Salvia evansiana Hand.-Mazz.Salvia exilis EplingSalvia expansa EplingSalvia exserta Griseb.

FSalvia fairuziana R.M.Haber & SemaanSalvia falcata J.R.I.Wood & HarleySalvia farinacea Benth.Salvia filicifolia Merr.Salvia filifolia RamamoorthySalvia filipes Benth.Salvia firma FernaldSalvia flaccida FernaldSalvia flaccidifolia FernaldSalvia flava Forrest ex DielsSalvia flocculosa Benth.Salvia florida Benth.Salvia fluviatilis FernaldSalvia fominii Grossh. & Sosn.Salvia formosa L'Hér.Salvia forreri GreeneSalvia forsskaolei L.Salvia foveolata Urb. & EkmanSalvia fracta L.O.WilliamsSalvia fragarioides C.Y.WuSalvia freyniana Bornm.Salvia frigida Boiss.Salvia fruticetorum Benth.Salvia fruticosa Mill.Salvia fruticulosa Benth.Salvia fugax Pobed.Salvia fulgens Cav.Salvia funckii Briq.Salvia funerea M.E.JonesSalvia fusca EplingSalvia fuscomanicata Fern.Alonso

GSalvia garedjii TroitskySalvia gariepensis E.Mey.Salvia garipensis E. Mey. ex BenthamSalvia gattefossei Emb.Salvia gesneriiflora Lindl. & PaxtonSalvia ghiesbreghtii FernaldSalvia glabra M.Martens & GaleottiSalvia glabrata KunthSalvia glabrescens MakinoSalvia glabricaulis Pobed.Salvia glandulifera Cav.Salvia glechomifolia KunthSalvia glumacea KunthSalvia glutinosa L.Salvia goldmanii FernaldSalvia golneviana RzazadeSalvia gontscharowii Kudrjasch.Salvia gonzalezii FernaldSalvia gracilipes EplingSalvia graciliramulosa Epling & JátivaSalvia grandifolia W.W.Sm.Salvia grandis EplingSalvia granitica Hochst.Salvia gravida EplingSalvia greatae BrandegeeSalvia greggii A.GraySalvia grewiifolia S.MooreSalvia grisea Epling & MathiasSalvia griseifolia EplingSalvia grossheimii Sosn.Salvia guadalujarensis Briq.Salvia guaraniticaSalvia guarinae Standl.

HSalvia haenkei Benth.Salvia haitiensis Urb.Salvia hajastana Pobed.Salvia halaensis VicarySalvia halophila HedgeSalvia hamulus EplingSalvia handelii E.PeterSalvia hapalophylla EplingSalvia harleyana E.P.SantosSalvia hasankeyfensis Dirmenci, Celep & Ö. Güner, 2015Salvia hatschbachii E.P.SantosSalvia haussknechtii Boiss.Salvia hayatae Makino ex HayataSalvia hedgeana DönmezSalvia heerii RegelSalvia heldreichiana Boiss.Salvia helianthemifolia Benth.Salvia henryi A.GraySalvia herbacea Benth.Salvia herbanica A.Santos & M. FernándezSalvia hermesiana Fern.AlonsoSalvia herrerae EplingSalvia heterochroa E.PeterSalvia heterofolia Epling & MathiasSalvia heterotricha FernaldSalvia hians Royle ex Benth.Salvia hidalgensis MirandaSalvia hierosolymitana Boiss.Salvia hilarii Benth.Salvia hillcoatiae HedgeSalvia himmelbaurii E.PeterSalvia hintonii EplingSalvia hirsuta Jacq.Salvia hirta KunthSalvia hirtella VahlSalvia hispanica L.Salvia holwayi S.F.BlakeSalvia honania L.H.BaileySalvia hotteana Urb. & EkmanSalvia huberi HedgeSalvia humboldtiana F.Dietr.Salvia hupehensis E.PeterSalvia hydrangea DC. ex Benth.Salvia hylocharis DielsSalvia hypargeia Fisch. & C.A.Mey.Salvia hypochionaea Boiss.Salvia hypoleuca Benth.

ISalvia incumbens Urb. & EkmanSalvia incurvata Ruiz & Pav.Salvia indica L.Salvia indigocephala RamamoorthySalvia infuscata EplingSalvia innoxia Epling & MathiasSalvia inornata EplingSalvia insignis Kudr.Salvia insularum EplingSalvia integrifolia Ruiz & Pav.Salvia interrupta Schousb.Salvia intonsa EplingSalvia involucrata Cav.Salvia iodantha FernaldSalvia iodophylla EplingSalvia ionocalyx EplingSalvia isensis Nakai ex H.HaraSalvia itaguassuensis Brade & Barb.Per.Salvia itatiaiensis DusénSalvia iuliana Epling

JSalvia jacobi EplingSalvia jaimehintoniana Ramamoorthy ex B.L.TurnerSalvia jamaicensis Fawc.Salvia jaminiana NoëSalvia jamzadii Mozaff.Salvia japonica Thunb.Salvia jaramilloi Fern.AlonsoSalvia jorgehintoniana Ramamoorthy ex B.L.TurnerSalvia judaica Boiss.Salvia jurisicii Kosanin

KSalvia kamelinii Makhm.Salvia karabachensis Pobed.Salvia karwinskii Benth.Salvia keerlii Benth.Salvia kellermanii Donn.Sm.Salvia kermanshahensis Rech.f.Salvia kiangsiensis C.Y.WuSalvia kiaometiensis H.Lév.Salvia komarovii Pobed.Salvia korolkovii Regel & Schmalh.Salvia koyamae MakinoSalvia kronenburgii Rech.f.Salvia kurdica Boiss. & Hohen. ex Benth.Salvia kuznetzovii Sosn.

LSalvia lachnaioclada Briq.Salvia lachnocalyx HedgeSalvia lachnostachys Benth.Salvia lachnostoma EplingSalvia laevis Benth.Salvia lamiifolia Jacq.Salvia lanceolata Lam.Salvia langlassei FernaldSalvia languidula EplingSalvia lanicalyx EplingSalvia lanicaulis Epling & JátivaSalvia lanigera Poir.Salvia lankongensis C.Y.WuSalvia lasiantha Benth.Salvia lasiocephala Hook. & Arn.Salvia lavandula AlainSalvia lavandulifolia VahlSalvia lavanduloides KunthSalvia laxispicata EplingSalvia lemmonii GraySalvia leninae EplingSalvia lenta FernaldSalvia leonia Benth.Salvia leptophylla Benth.Salvia leptostachys Benth.Salvia leriifolia Benth.Salvia leucantha Cav.Salvia leucocephala KunthSalvia leucochlamys EplingSalvia leucodermis BakerSalvia leucophylla GreeneSalvia libanensis RusbySalvia liguliloba Y.Z.SunSalvia lilacinocoerulea NevskiSalvia limbata C.A.Mey.Salvia lineata Benth.Salvia lipskyi Pobed.Salvia littae Vis.Salvia lobbii EplingSalvia longibracteolata E.P.SantosSalvia longipedicellata HedgeSalvia longispicata M.Martens & GaleottiSalvia longistyla Benth.Salvia lophanthoides FernaldSalvia loxensis Benth.Salvia lozanii FernaldSalvia lutescens (Koidz.) Koidz.Salvia lycioides A.GraySalvia lyrata L.

MSalvia macellaria EplingSalvia macilenta Boiss.Salvia macrocalyx GardnerSalvia macrochlamys Boiss. & KotschySalvia macrophylla Benth.Salvia macrosiphon Boiss.Salvia macrostachya KunthSalvia madrensis Seem.Salvia mairei H.Lév.Salvia malvifolia Epling & JátivaSalvia manantlanensis RamamoorthySalvia manaurica Fern.AlonsoSalvia marashica A. İlçim, F. Celep & DoğanSalvia marci EplingSalvia margaritae Botsch.Salvia mattogrossensis Pilg.Salvia maximowicziana Hemsl.Salvia maxonii EplingSalvia maymanica HedgeSalvia mayorii Briq.Salvia mazatlanensis FernaldSalvia medusa Epling & JátivaSalvia meiliensis S.W.SuSalvia mekongensis E.PeterSalvia melaleuca EplingSalvia melissiflora Benth.Salvia melissodora Lag.Salvia mellifera GreeneSalvia mentiens PohlSalvia merjamie Forssk.Salvia mexiae EplingSalvia mexicana L.Salvia microdictya Urb. & EkmanSalvia microphylla KunthSalvia microstegia Boiss. & BalansaSalvia miltiorrhiza BungeSalvia minarum Briq.Salvia miniata FernaldSalvia mirzayanii Rech.f. & Esfand.Salvia misella KunthSalvia mocinoi Benth.Salvia modesta Boiss.Salvia modica EplingSalvia mohavensis GreeneSalvia monantha Brandegee ex EplingSalvia monclovensis FernaldSalvia moniliformis FernaldSalvia montbretii Benth.Salvia montecristina Urb. & EkmanSalvia moorcroftiana Wall. ex Benth.Salvia mornicola Urb. & EkmanSalvia mouretii Batt. & Pit.Salvia muelleri EplingSalvia muirii L.BolusSalvia mukerjeei Bennet & RaizadaSalvia multicaulis VahlSalvia munzii EplingSalvia muscarioides Fernald

NSalvia namaensis SchinzSalvia nana KunthSalvia nanchuanensis H.t'S.SunSalvia napifolia Jacq.Salvia nazalena Hedge & MouterdeSalvia nemoralis Dusén ex EplingSalvia nemorosa L.Salvia neovidensis Benth.Salvia nepetoides KunthSalvia nervata M.Martens & GaleottiSalvia nervosa Benth.Salvia nilotica Juss. ex Jacq.Salvia nipponica Miq.Salvia nitida (M.Martens & Galeotti) Benth.Salvia nubicola Wall. ex SweetSalvia nubigena J.R.I.Wood & HarleySalvia nubilorum Játiva & EplingSalvia nutans L.Salvia nydeggeri Hub.-Mor.

OSalvia oaxacana FernaldSalvia oblongifolia M.Martens & GaleottiSalvia obtorta EplingSalvia obtusata Thunb.Salvia obumbrata EplingSalvia occidentalis Sw.Salvia occidua EplingSalvia occultiflora EplingSalvia ochrantha EplingSalvia ocimifolia EplingSalvia odontochlamys HedgeSalvia officinalis L.Salvia oligantha DusénSalvia oligophylla Aucher ex Benth.Salvia ombrophila DusénSalvia omeiana E.PeterSalvia omerocalyx HayataSalvia opertiflora EplingSalvia ophiocephala J.R.I.WoodSalvia oppositiflora Ruiz & Pav.Salvia orbignaei Benth.Salvia oreopola FernaldSalvia oresbia FernaldSalvia orthostachys EplingSalvia ovalifolia A.St.-Hil. ex Benth.Salvia oxyphora Briq.

PSalvia pachyphylla Epling ex MunzSalvia pachypoda Briq.Salvia pachystachya Trautv.Salvia palaestina Benth.Salvia palealis EplingSalvia palifolia KunthSalvia pallida Benth.Salvia palmeri A.GraySalvia pamplonitana Fern.AlonsoSalvia pannosa FernaldSalvia pansamalensis Donn.Sm.Salvia paohsingensis C.Y.WuSalvia paposana Phil.Salvia paraguariensis Briq.Salvia paramicola Fern.AlonsoSalvia paramiltiorrhiza H.W.Li & X.L.HuangSalvia parciflora Urb.Salvia parryi A.GraySalvia parvifolia BakerSalvia paryskii Skean & JuddSalvia patens Cav.Salvia pauciflora KunthSalvia pauciserrata Benth.Salvia paupercula EplingSalvia pavonii Benth.Salvia penduliflora EplingSalvia peninsularis BrandegeeSalvia pennellii EplingSalvia pentstemonoides K.Koch & C.D.BouchéSalvia peratica PaineSalvia perblanda EplingSalvia peregrina EplingSalvia perlonga FernaldSalvia perlucida EplingSalvia perplicata EplingSalvia perrieri HedgeSalvia persepolitana Boiss.Salvia persicifolia A.St.-Hil. ex Benth.Salvia personata EplingSalvia pexa EplingSalvia peyronii Boiss.Salvia phaenostemma Donn.Sm.Salvia phlomoides AssoSalvia piasezkii Maxim.Salvia pichinchensis Benth.Salvia pilifera Montbret & Aucher ex Benth.Salvia pineticola EplingSalvia pinguifolia (Fernald) Wooton & Standl.Salvia pinnata L.Salvia pisidica Boiss. & Heldr. ex Benth.Salvia platycheila A.GraySalvia platyphylla Briq.Salvia plebeia R.Br.Salvia plectranthoides Griff.Salvia plumosa Ruiz & Pav.Salvia plurispicata EplingSalvia poculata NábelekSalvia podadena Briq.Salvia pogonochila Diels ex Limpr.Salvia polystachya Cav.Salvia pomifera L.Salvia porphyrocalyx BakerSalvia potaninii KrylovSalvia potentillifolia Boiss. & Heldr. ex Benth.Salvia potus EplingSalvia praestans EplingSalvia praeterita EplingSalvia prasiifolia Benth.Salvia pratensis L.Salvia prattii Hemsl.Salvia prilipkoana Grossh. & Sosn.Salvia primuliformis EplingSalvia pringlei B.L.Rob. & Greenm.Salvia prionitis HanceSalvia procurrens Benth.Salvia propinqua Benth.Salvia prostratus Hook.f.Salvia protracta Benth.Salvia pruinosa FernaldSalvia prunelloides KunthSalvia prunifolia FernaldSalvia przewalskii Maxim.Salvia pseudoincisa EplingSalvia pseudojaminiana A.Chev.Salvia pseudomisella Moran & G.A.LevinSalvia pseudopallida EplingSalvia pseudoprivoides EplingSalvia pseudorosmarinus EplingSalvia pseudoserotina EplingSalvia psilantha EplingSalvia psilostachya EplingSalvia pterocalyx HedgeSalvia pteroura Briq.Salvia puberula FernaldSalvia pubescens Benth.Salvia pulchella DC.Salvia punctata Ruiz & Pav.Salvia purpurea Cav.Salvia purpusii BrandegeeSalvia pusilla FernaldSalvia pygmaea Matsum.

QSalvia qimenensis S.W.Su & J.Q.HeSalvia quercetorum EplingSalvia quezelii Hedge & Afzal-RafiiSalvia quitensis Benth.

RSalvia radula Benth.Salvia ramamoorthyana EspejoSalvia ramosa BrandegeeSalvia ranzaniana MakinoSalvia raveniana RamamoorthySalvia raymondii J.R.I.WoodSalvia rechingeri HedgeSalvia recognita Fisch. & C.A.Mey.Salvia recurva Benth.Salvia reeseana Hedge & Hub.-Mor.Salvia reflexa Hornem.Salvia regla Cav.Salvia regnelliana Briq.Salvia reitzii EplingSalvia remota Benth.Salvia repens Burch. ex Benth.Salvia reptans Jacq.Salvia retinervia Briq.Salvia reuteriana Boiss.Salvia revoluta Ruiz & Pav.Salvia rhodostephana EplingSalvia rhombifolia Ruiz & Pav.Salvia rhyacophila (Fernald) EplingSalvia rhytidea Benth.Salvia ringens Sm.Salvia rivularis GardnerSalvia roborowskii Maxim.Salvia roemeriana ScheeleSalvia roscida FernaldSalvia rosei FernaldSalvia rosifolia Sm.Salvia rosmarinoides A.St.-Hil. ex Benth.Salvia rostellata EplingSalvia rubescens KunthSalvia rubifolia Boiss.Salvia rubrifaux EplingSalvia rubriflora EplingSalvia rubropunctata B.L.Rob. & FernaldSalvia rufula KunthSalvia runcinata L.f.Salvia rupicola FernaldSalvia rusbyi Britton ex RusbySalvia russellii Benth.Salvia rypara Briq.Salvia rzedowskii Ramamoorthy

SSalvia saccardiana Pamp. Del Carr. & GarbariSalvia saccifera Urb. & EkmanSalvia sacculus EplingSalvia sagittata Ruiz & Pav.Salvia sahendica Boiss. & BuhseSalvia salicifolia PohlSalvia samuelssonii Rech.f.Salvia sanctae-luciae Seem.Salvia santolinifolia Boiss.Salvia sapinea EplingSalvia sarmentosa EplingSalvia Sativa L.Salvia saxicola Wall. ex Benth.Salvia scabiosifolia Lam.Salvia scabra Thunb.Salvia scabrata Britton & P.WilsonSalvia scabrida PohlSalvia scandens EplingSalvia scapiformis HanceSalvia scaposa EplingSalvia schimperi Benth.Salvia schizocalyx E.PeterSalvia schizochila E.PeterSalvia schlechteri Briq.Salvia schmalbausenii RegelSalvia sciaphila (J.R.I.Wood & Harley) Fern.AlonsoSalvia sclarea L.Salvia sclareoides Brot.Salvia sclareopsis Bornm. ex HedgeSalvia scoparia EplingSalvia scutellarioides KunthSalvia scytinophylla Briq.Salvia secunda Benth.Salvia seemannii FernaldSalvia segtinophylla Briq. Salvia selguapensis Ant.MolinaSalvia selleana Urb.Salvia sellowiana Benth.Salvia semiatrata Zucc.Salvia seravschanica Regel & Schmalh.Salvia sericeotomentosa Rech.f.Salvia serotina L.Salvia serpyllifolia FernaldSalvia serranoae J.R.I.WoodSalvia sessei Benth.Salvia sessilifolia BakerSalvia setosa FernaldSalvia setulosa FernaldSalvia shannonii Donn.Sm.Salvia sharifii Rech.f. & Esfand.Salvia sharpii Epling & MathiasSalvia sibthorpii SmithSalvia sigchosica Fern.AlonsoSalvia sikkimensis E.PeterSalvia silvarum EplingSalvia similis BrandegeeSalvia sinaloensis FernaldSalvia sinica MigoSalvia smithii E.PeterSalvia smyrnaea Boiss.Salvia somalensis VatkeSalvia sonchifolia C.Y.WuSalvia sonklarii Pant.Salvia sonomensis GreeneSalvia sophrona Briq.Salvia sordida Benth.Salvia sparsiflora EplingSalvia spathacea GreeneSalvia speciosa C.Presl ex Benth.Salvia speirematoides C.WrightSalvia sphacelifolia EplingSalvia sphacelioides Benth.Salvia spinosa L.Salvia splendens Sellow ex Roem. & Schult.Salvia sprucei Briq.Salvia squalens KunthSalvia stachydifolia Benth.Salvia stachyoides KunthSalvia staminea Montbret & Aucher ex Benth.Salvia stenophylla Burch. ex Benth.Salvia stibalii AlziarSalvia stolonifera Benth.Salvia striata Benth.Salvia strobilanthoidea C.Wright ex Griseb.Salvia styphelos EplingSalvia subaequalis EplingSalvia subglabra (Urb.) Urb.Salvia subhastata EplingSalvia subincisa Benth.Salvia submutica Botsch. & Vved.Salvia subobscura EplingSalvia subpalmatinervis E.PeterSalvia subpatens EplingSalvia subrotunda A.St.-Hil. ex Benth.Salvia subrubens EplingSalvia subscandens Epling & JátivaSalvia substolonifera E.PeterSalvia sucrensis J.R.I.WoodSalvia suffruticosa Montbret & Aucher ex Benth.Salvia summa A.NelsonSalvia × superbaSalvia synodonta EplingSalvia syriaca L.

TSalvia tafallae Benth.Salvia taraxacifolia Coss. & BalansaSalvia tchihatcheffii (Fisch. & C.A.Mey.) Boiss.Salvia tebesana BungeSalvia teddii TurrillSalvia tehuacana FernaldSalvia tenella Sw.Salvia tenuiflora EplingSalvia tepicensis FernaldSalvia teresae FernaldSalvia tesquicola Klok. & Pobed.Salvia tetrodonta Hedge
 Salvia texan (Scheele) Torr.Salvia texana (Scheele) Torr.Salvia thermarum van Jaarsv.Salvia thomasiana Urb.Salvia thormannii Urb.Salvia thymoides Benth.Salvia thyrsiflora Benth.Salvia tianschanica Machm.Salvia tigrina Hedge & Hub.-Mor.Salvia tiliifolia VahlSalvia tingitana Etl.Salvia tobeyi HedgeSalvia tolimensis KunthSalvia tomentella PohlSalvia tomentosa Mill.Salvia tonalensis BrandegeeSalvia topiensis Gonzalez-Gallegos, 2013Salvia tortuensis Urb.Salvia tortuosa KunthSalvia townsendii FernaldSalvia trachyphylla EplingSalvia transhimalaica Yonek.Salvia transsylvanica (Schur ex Griseb. & Schenk)Salvia trautvetteri RegelSalvia triangularis Thunb.Salvia trichocalycina Benth.Salvia trichoclada Benth.Salvia trichopes EplingSalvia trichostephana EplingSalvia tricuspidata M.Martens & GaleottiSalvia tricuspis Franch.Salvia trifilis EplingSalvia trijuga DielsSalvia tubifera Cav.Salvia tubiflora Sm.Salvia tubulosa EplingSalvia tuerckheimii Urb.Salvia turcomanica Pobed.Salvia turdi A.Rich.Salvia turneri RamamoorthySalvia tuxtlensis RamamoorthySalvia tysonii Skan

U

 Salvia ulignosa Benth.Salvia uliginosa Benth.Salvia umbratica HanceSalvia umbraticola EplingSalvia umbratilis FernaldSalvia uncinata Urb.Salvia unguella EplingSalvia unicostata FernaldSalvia univerticillata Ramamoorthy ex Klitg.Salvia uribei J.R.I.Wood & HarleySalvia urica EplingSalvia urmiensis BungeSalvia urolepis FernaldSalvia urticifolia L.Salvia uruapana Fernald

VSalvia valentina VahlSalvia vargasii EplingSalvia vaseyi (Porter) ParishSalvia vasta H.W.LiSalvia veneris HedgeSalvia venulosa EplingSalvia verapazana B.L.TurnerSalvia verbascifolia M.Bieb.Salvia verbenaca L.Salvia verecunda EplingSalvia vergeduzica RzazadeSalvia vermifolia Hedge & Hub.-Mor.Salvia veronicifolia A.Gray ex S.WatsonSalvia verticillata L.Salvia vestita Benth.Salvia vialis BrandegeeSalvia villosa FernaldSalvia vinacea L.Salvia virgata Jacq.Salvia viridis L.Salvia viscida A.St.-Hil. ex Benth.Salvia viscidifolia EplingSalvia viscosa Jacq.Salvia vitifolia Benth.Salvia vvedenskii Nikitina

WSalvia wagneriana Pol.Salvia wardii E.PeterSalvia warszewicziana RegelSalvia weberbaueri EplingSalvia weihaiensis C.Y.Wu & H.W.LiSalvia wendelboi HedgeSalvia whitefoordiae Klitg.Salvia whitehousei AlziarSalvia wiedemannii Boiss.Salvia willeana (Holmboe) Hedge

XSalvia xalapensis Benth.Salvia xanthocheila Boiss. ex Benth.Salvia xanthophylla Epling & JátivaSalvia xanthotricha Harley ex E.P.SantosSalvia xeropapillosa Fern.Alonso

YSalvia yosgadensis Freyn & Bornm.Salvia yukoyukparum Fern.AlonsoSalvia yunnanensis C.H.Wright

ZSalvia zacualpanensis Briq.

 Interspecific hybrids 
* S. longispicata x S. farinaceaOther’s:
 Salvia x accidentalis Salvia x amistad Salvia x auriculata Salvia x dyson's joy
 Salvia x hegelmaieri
 Salvia x hot lips
 Salvia x jamensis
 Salvia x jezebel
 Salvia x love & wishes
 Salvia x nachtvlinder
 Salvia x ribambelle
 Salvia x royal bumble
 Salvia x sakuensis
 Salvia x superba
 Salvia x sylvestris

References

Salvia